Disanxian is a Chinese dish made of stir-fried potatoes, eggplants, and sweet peppers. Other ingredients may include garlic, spring onion, etc. The name roughly translates to "three treasures from the earth" because it consists of the three key ingredients listed above. It is considered a classic dish in Northeastern Chinese cuisine, and is common in northern China.

See also

 List of eggplant dishes
 List of vegetable dishes
 List of potato dishes

References

External links
 Sunflower Food Galore: Di San Xian (recipe)
 Di san xian recipe at Cooking Simple Chinese food at Home

Potato dishes
Eggplant dishes